Oghur may refer to:
 an early Turkic word for "tribe", see Turkic tribal confederations and Oğurs
 the Turkic Oghur languages
 Yugra